Caroline Maria Noel (1817–1877) was an English hymnographer.

Life
Noel was born on 10 April 1817 into an aristocratic family, daughter to Church of England cleric Gerard Thomas Noel and Charlotte Sophia, and was the niece of aristocratic clergyman Baptist Wriothesley Noel. She had 5 sisters; Anna Sophia, Louisa Diana, Charlotte, Emma and Elizabeth. She started to write poems aged 17, but ceased to do so for many years afterwards. In the last 25 years of her life she was struck down by crippling illness which left her bedridden. Due to this illness, Noel returned to writing poems and published a collection of verses in 1870 called The Name of Jesus. She died at 39 Cumberland Place, Hyde Park, London, on 7 December 1877 aged 60. She was buried at Romsey Abbey.

Notable works
 "At the Name of Jesus"

References

1817 births
1877 deaths
19th-century hymnwriters